The 2011 FedEx 400 benefiting Autism Speaks was held on 15 May 2011 at Dover International Speedway in Dover, Delaware. Contested over 400 laps on the  concrete oval, it was the eleventh race of the 2011 Sprint Cup Series season. The race was won by Matt Kenseth for the Roush Fenway Racing team with Mark Martin second ahead of Marcos Ambrose.

References

FedEx 400
FedEx 400
NASCAR races at Dover Motor Speedway
May 2011 sports events in the United States